Wanica is a district of Suriname located in the north of the country. Wanica's capital city is Lelydorp, the second-largest city in Suriname. 
Wanica has a population of 118,222 and an area of 443 km2. Following neighbouring Paramaribo, Wanica is the second most populated and urbanised district of Suriname. Two-thirds of the country's population live in these two districts.

History
The district was created in 1983 out of parts of the former Suriname District. The district was named Wanica after Pad van Wanica, the main road, Wanica Creek (present in the district), and the fact that the name had already been used on old maps.

The discovery of gold in Brokopondo and Sipaliwini lead to the construction of the Lawa Railway and growth of the villages next to the railway line, and especially Kofi Djompo. The railway line was decommissioned in 1986.

The district's capital, originally called Kofi Djompo, was renamed in 1905 for Dutch architect Cornelis Lely, who was responsible for many large construction projects in the Netherlands and was also governor of Suriname. Javanese immigration and the closeness to Paramaribo, have resulted in a partially suburban, and still partially agricultural district. The beginning of the 21st century have seen many building projects in the district.

Rice used to be the main crops grown in Wanica, but the late 20th century saw a shift towards animal husbandry. Fruit and vegetables are of lesser significance. Trade and businesses have increased, and are mainly located around Lelydorp. Lelydorp needs a clear city structure and has many agricultural areas close to the centre and neighbourhoods.

Resorts 

Wanica is divided into 7 resorts (ressorten):
 De Nieuwe Grond
 Domburg
 Houttuin
 Koewarasan
 Kwatta
 Lelydorp
 Saramacca Polder

Villages 
 Santigron

References

External links

 
Districts of Suriname